Netafim is an Israeli manufacturer of irrigation equipment. The company produces drippers, dripperlines, sprinklers and micro-emitters. Netafim also manufactures and distributes crop management technologies, including monitoring and control systems, dosing systems, and crop management software, as well as a variety of services, including managed irrigation, agronomical advisory and operation and maintenance. As of 2012, Netafim was the global leader on the fast expanding market of drip- and micro-irrigation. In it was the overall largest provider of drip irrigation systems, with a global market share of 30%.

History

In 2020, Netafim held an over-30% share of the global drip irrigation market. The company recorded revenues of over $1.063 billion in 2019.

Netafim is headed by President & CEO Gaby Miodownik, and jointly owned by Orbia (80%) and Kibbutz Hatzerim (20%), following extensive bidding by half a dozen interested parties, including U.S. industrial technologies company Fortive Corp (FTV.N), Singapore's Temasek Holdings [TEM.UL], U.S. tools maker Stanley Black & Decker (SWK.N), Chinese investment fund Primavera and Chinese pipe maker Ningxia Qinglong (002457.SZ).

Timeline
 1960–1965 – Water engineer and inventor Simcha Blass  carries out tests on the world's first dripper device.
 1965 – Kibbutz Hatzerim signs agreement with Blass to establish Netafim
 1966 – Introduces world's first commercial dripper
 1978 – Introduces world's first pressure compensated (PC) dripper
 1981 – Opens first subsidiary outside of Israel 
 1998 – Merges into single corporation 
 2007 – Introduces world's first low-flow dripper
 2011 – Permira funds acquires controlling interest for €800m
 2013 – Named 2013 Stockholm Industry Water Award (SIWI) Laureate
 2020 – Netafim acquires Dutch turnkey greenhouse projects provider Gakon, establishing Gakon Netafim

On August 7, 2017, Mexichem SA announced it would acquire Netafim from Permira Holdings Ltd. for $1.5 billion.

Ownership

In 1973, Netafim brought in its first partner, Kibbutz Magal, based in the Sharon region, and then added a second partner, Kibbutz Yiftach, based in the Upper Galilee region, in 1978. Netafim Hatzerim, Magal and Yiftach merged to create Netafim (ACS) Ltd in 1998. In 2006, Markstone Capital Partners Group and Tene Investment Funds acquired a share of Netafim. In 2011, the European private equity fund Permira acquired a majority (61%) stake in Netafim, with Kibbutz Hatzerim holding 33% and Kibbutz Magal holding 6%.  In 2017, these owners sold 80% of Netafim to Mexichem, with Kibbutz Hatzerim retaining 20%.

Products
Netafim produces drip irrigation systems and other water technologies intended to increase yields and improve crop production while preserving quality and quantity of water and soil fertility. The company products are designed to provide solutions in the areas of efficient irrigation, control and agronomy for a range of field crops, orchards and vineyards grown under varied topographic and climatic conditions throughout the world. At present Netafim is developing ecological solutions for producing fuel from alternative sources. Concurrently, Netafim is launching a low pressure irrigation system that offers a solution for areas where water pressure and/or electrical infrastructure do not permit using high pressure systems. This development will facilitate introduction of the drip irrigation systems into additional agricultural areas.

Global presence
In 1981, the company opened NII, its first international subsidiary, in the US. Today Netafim maintains 33 subsidiaries
and 17 manufacturing plants worldwide, and employs over 5,000 workers.
In January 2014, it was announced on Bloomberg that Netafim had won a $62 million water project contract to  build an automated water pipeline network in the southern state of Karnataka, India.
Since then, Netafim has won additional 7 community irrigation projects in India covering in total 106,000 hectares and 97,000 farmers.
In March 2016, it was announced in Globes that Netafim had won a 200 million project in Ethiopia to provide an end-to-end irrigation solution for a plantation by the Ethiopian government sugar company.
In March 2019, Netafim won a $60 million project in Rwanda to develop an agribusiness hub.

Drip irrigation & sustainability
Netafim is involved in several global sustainability initiatives. The company is a member of the UN CEO Water Mandate and UN Global Compact (UNGC), and was named 2013 Stockholm Industry Water Award Laureate for its contribution to sustainable water management. According to company sources, the use of drip irrigation for rice and tomatoes cuts down on greenhouse gases and nitrous oxide associated with algae blooms.

See also
Science and technology in Israel
Economy of Israel
Agricultural research in Israel
Agriculture in Israel
Bermad

References

Agriculture companies of Israel
Hydroculture
Low-flow irrigation systems
Manufacturing companies based in Tel Aviv
Agriculture companies established in 1965
Manufacturing companies established in 1965
1965 establishments in Israel
Israeli brands
Israeli inventions
Permira companies
Irrigation companies